Yaroslav Vatamanyuk (born 25 May 1963 in Zhydachiv Raion, Lviv Oblast) is a retired Soviet football player and current Ukrainian coach. He is a recordsman of the FC Spartak Ivano-Frankivsk – 530 played matches for club, including 516 league games.

External links
   Profile 
  Biography on Unofficial website of the FSC Prykarpattya Ivano-Frankivsk
  

1963 births
Living people
Soviet footballers
Ukrainian footballers
Ukraine international footballers
Ukrainian football managers
Ukrainian Premier League players
FC Spartak Ivano-Frankivsk players
FC Spartak Ivano-Frankivsk managers
Association football defenders
Sportspeople from Lviv Oblast